Gouren is a style of folk wrestling which has been established in Brittany for several centuries.

In today's France, Gouren is overseen by the Fédération de Gouren which has an agreement with the Fédération Française de Lutte (French Wrestling Federation).

History

Gouren was especially popular in Brittany towards the beginning of the 20th century, before the beginning of World War I (1914), with competitions every Sunday during the summer season in numerous small villages.

In 1930, in order to revitalize the practice of gouren, Charles Cottonec of Quimperlé (Finistère) breathed new life into the sport with the creation of a set of rules: age and weight categories, limited time of contest, and the creation of a federation.

Today gouren is well-organised. It has its own federation, clubs (skoliou), and its own European Championships which take place every two years.

Gouren has also kept its cultural ties, and displays of the martial art can be seen alongside traditional Breton music and dance.

Rules
The wrestlers, required to fight barefoot, wear a special white shirt or vest (roched) tied with a belt and black trousers (bragoù), and try to throw each other to the ground by grappling the other's roched. A victory (lamm) is declared when the opponent is on his back on the ground, with the winner standing. Victory is only achieved when both the opponent's shoulder blades hit the ground at the same time, and before any other part of the body. Each bout lasts seven minutes maximum.

Results

The Lamm
The perfect result is the lamm. It ends the bout immediately. The goal is to throw the opponent to obtain a backfall with both shoulders blades touching the ground at the same time, before any other part of the body and before any part of the opponent's.

The Kostin
It is the next best result, very close to the lamm : a fall on one shoulder, for example. It is counted at the end of a bout. It is worth 4 points.

The Kein
It is an advantage and is taken into account at the end of an astenn (extra time: half the time of a bout). It is a fall of the inferior part of the back, or the whole back and posterior.

See also
 Collar-and-elbow
 Cornish wrestling
 Cumberland and Westmorland wrestling
 Greco-Roman Wrestling
 Scottish Backhold

External links 
Fédération de Gouren
Skol Gouren Orvez
Map of further sites
promotion of Gouren (FR)

European martial arts
Breton sport and leisure
Folk wrestling styles
Sports originating in France

Historical European martial arts